The Pagan Lady is a 1931 American pre-Code drama film directed by John Francis Dillon and starring Evelyn Brent. It is based on the Broadway play Pagan Lady (1930) written by William DuBois.

Cast
 Evelyn Brent as Dorothy 'Dot' Hunter
 Conrad Nagel as Ernest Todd
 Charles Bickford as Dingo Mike
 Roland Young as Dr. Heath
 William Farnum as Malcolm 'Mal' Todd
 Lucile Gleason as Nellie (as Lucille Gleason)
 Leslie Fenton as Gerald 'Gerry' Willis
 Gwen Lee as Gwen Willis
 Wallace MacDonald as Francisco
 Adrian Morris as Snooper the Henchman

References

External links

1931 films
1931 drama films
American drama films
American black-and-white films
Columbia Pictures films
American films based on plays
Films directed by John Francis Dillon
1930s English-language films
1930s American films
English-language drama films